Tekla Åberg (26 October 1853 – 17 November 1922) was a Swedish teacher and school director. She was a pioneer for girl's education in Sweden and was the founder and director of the first grammar school for girls outside Stockholm, .

Life 
Tekla Åberg was born in a wealthy family on 26 October 1853, in Åmål, Dalsland, Sweden. She was the daughter of mill owner Johan (Janne) Åberg, and his wife Britta Johanna Oldenskjöld. Åberg's several siblings died in infancy, and their mother died in childbirth. Her father remarried a widow, who had five children of her own. All the children of the Åberg family were taught at home. In 1886, at the age of 32, Åberg enrolled as a private student and graduated from college. In 1888, she took over the Fru Elise Mayers högre läroverk för flickor girls high school, and renamed it to Tekla Åbergs högre läroverk för flickor (Tekla Åberg's higher education for girls). It became the first educational institution in the country outside Stockholm where girls could matriculate.

Åberg remained unmarried in her life. She was awarded the Illis Quorum for her outstanding contribution to Swedish society. Tekla Åberg died on 17 November 1922, of a heart attack and is buried at Norra begravningsplatsen in Stockholm.

Bibliography 
 Lövkvist, Linda (2018). Svenskt kvinnobiografiskt lexikon, (In Swedish). University of Gothenburg. .
 Grosjean, Alexia. Svenskt kvinnobiografiskt lexikon [Biographical Dictionary of Swedish Women], (In English). University of Gothenburg. .

References

Further reading 
 

1853 births
1922 deaths
19th-century Swedish educators
People from Åmål Municipality
20th-century Swedish educators
Swedish women educators
Women educational personnel
Burials at Norra begravningsplatsen